Harold Waldmere Rumney (16 May 1907 – 16 November 1987) was an Australian rules footballer.

Rumney was rejected by Carlton Football Club after 15 games in two seasons and transferred to Collingwood Football Club. His arrival at Collingwood was fortuitous. He played in the quartet of premierships, 1927–1930, as well as the 1935 premiership. He left Collingwood to coach Northcote in the VFA for season 1936 but returned to Collingwood in 1937. He regularly represented Victoria and won Collingwood's best and fairest award in 1931.

He was 171 cm tall and weighed 76 kg. He played 15 games for Carlton, scoring 9 goals, and 171 games for Collingwood, scoring 28 goals.

References

Holmesby, Russell and Main, Jim (2007). The Encyclopedia of AFL Footballers. 7th ed. Melbourne: Bas Publishing.

External links

Carlton Football Club players
Collingwood Football Club players
Collingwood Football Club Premiership players
Brighton Football Club players
Northcote Football Club players
Northcote Football Club coaches
Copeland Trophy winners
Australian rules footballers from Victoria (Australia)
1907 births
1987 deaths
Five-time VFL/AFL Premiership players